Cocoliche is an Italian–Spanish contact language or pidgin that was spoken by Italian immigrants in Argentina (especially in Greater Buenos Aires) and Uruguay between 1870 and 1970. In the last decades it has become more respected and even recorded in music and film. It is found in Lunfardo,Brazil,Albania,Panama,Quebec, Uruguay, Argentina,Venezuela,San Marcos,Cabo Verde and many other places.

History

Between 1880 and 1910, Argentina and Uruguay received a large number of Italian immigrants, mostly poor country folk who arrived with little or no schooling in the Spanish language and often were not even literate in their own Italian languages.

As those immigrants strove to communicate with the local criollos, they produced a variable mixture of Spanish with Standard Italian (Florentine) and other Italian dialects, which was given the name Cocoliche by the locals.

The name Cocoliche originated in an 1884 pantomime adaptation by José Podestá of a theatre production titled Juan Moreira. One night one of the actors began an improvised exchange with a Calabrese stage hand name Antonio Cocoliche, which brought delight to the audience due to Cocoliche's "broken" Spanish with Italian characteristics. This resulted in the introduction of a recurring comedic character named Francisco Cocoliche with that same way of speaking, influencing how the language of the Italian immigrants was viewed in Argentinean popular culture. Thereafter, the name of Cocoliche came into Argentinian vernacular to refer to the mixed Italian-Spanish language that the Italian immigrants spoke in Argentina.

Italian proper never developed in Argentina, especially because most immigrants used their local languages, and were not proficient in the standard language. This inhibited the development of an Italian-language culture. Since the children of the immigrants grew up speaking Spanish at school, work, and military service, Cocoliche remained confined mostly to the first and second generation of Italian immigrants, and slowly fell out of use.

Controversy 
Cocoliche has sparked controversy amongst Spanish language scholars since its inception in the 19th Century. In 1960, the philologist Américo Castro lamented the Italian influence on Spanish that it caused, stating that it "has contributed more than anything to tear apart the language of Buenos Aires." Argentinean Author Jorge Luis Borges directly argues with Castro's essay in a letter, stating mainly that his idea of a Spanish language of Buenos Aires having to be as pure as that of Castile is folly. According to Borges, the Italian influences of Argentinian Spanish do not take away from the dignity of the language. Furthermore, he references his travels throughout Spain, where he mentions that Spaniards do not speak better that Argentinians even with a "purer" Spanish, meaning that if anything, Cocoliche's influence has only strengthened the language.

Its status as a pidgin has been contested by linguists and philologists throughout the 20th Century. Argentinian linguist María Beatriz Fontanella De Weiberg posits that the language never became a pidgin due to the clear attempts of the government to integrate immigrants, leading Cocoliche to quickly disappear as immigrants rapidly adopted the culture and Spanish language of Argentina. She states it didn't have the reason to remain and become a pidgin because it was not necessary to thrive in oppressive circumstances the way other pidgins have.

Influence
Following Cocoliche's introduction into normal Argentinian Spanish speech, and its subsequent disappearance as an independent language, it left many traces of itself in local language. It intermixed with existing Argentinian Spanish characteristics like voseo and yeismo while providing a new intonation for the Rioplatense Spanish variety and its neighboring dialects.

Many Cocoliche words were transferred to Lunfardo. For example:

  ("to eat") from Venetian  and Lombard  ( in Italian)
  (fool)
 fungi (mushroom) -> in Lunfardo: hat
 vento (wind) -> in Lunfardo: money
 matina (morning) from Italian "mattina"
 mina (girl) from Lombard "mina" (busty woman or prostitute)
 laburar (to work) from Italian "lavorare"
 yeta (bad luck) from Neapolitan 
 yira (to go for a walk) from Italian "girare"
 salute (cheers) from Italian "salute"
 fiaca (laziness) from Italian "fiacca"

Some of these words show a characteristic codialect evolution, for example in the case of manyar, the word manyar exists with the same meaning in Spanish even though it is considered jargon and not proper Spanish, being derived from Occitan  and reinforced by the Italian .

See also
 Adoniran Barbosa, composer in the analogous Italian-Portuguese pidgin.
 Italian immigration to Argentina
 Lunfardo
 Talian dialect

Notes

External links
 
 What is lunfardo

Buenos Aires
Italian-Argentine culture
Italian-Uruguayan culture
Italian language in the Americas
Spanish language
Languages of Argentina
Extinct languages of South America
Macaronic language
Languages attested from the 1870s
Languages extinct in the 1970s
City colloquials